Benjamin Partridge (born 1986) is a Welsh comedy writer, performer and producer. He created the Beef And Dairy Network Podcast.

Career
Partridge's professional writing career began when he was awarded the BBC Radio Comedy Writers Bursary in 2011.

Partridge has written for radio, television and live performance. He writes for the CBBC show Horrible Histories, on BBC Radio Wales he is one of the cast and a co-writer of Elis James's Pantheon of Heroes and he also co-writes and produced the second series of Here Be Dragons, which won Bronze at the Radio Academy Awards in 2014. He also devised the BBC Radio 4 panel show It's Your Round.

Amongst his other writing credits are The Now Show, The News Quiz, Listen Against, Small Scenes for BBC Radio 4 and Newsjack for BBC Radio 4 Extra.

In 2013, he performed his one-man show, An Audience With Jeff Goldblum, at the Edinburgh Festival Fringe.

Since July 2015, he writes, presents and produces the Beef And Dairy Network Podcast, which is part of the Maximum Fun podcast network. A sitcom that Partridge co-wrote with Gareth Gwynn, Ankle Tag, was broadcast on BBC Radio 4 in 2017 and 2018 and 2020. In 2021 he launched the Three Bean Salad podcast with fellow comedians Mike Wozniak and Henry Paker.

References

External links
 
 Beef and Dairy Network podcast
 Ben Partridge: Machynlleth Comedy Festival - 2011 radio interview with Bethan Elfyn

British comedy writers
Welsh male comedians
1986 births
Date of birth missing (living people)
Living people